Crescent Springs is an unincorporated community and census-designated place (CDP) in Logan County, Oklahoma, United States. It was first listed as a CDP prior to the 2020 census.

The CDP is in western Logan County, bordered to the south by Cimarron City. Oklahoma State Highway 74 forms the eastern edge of the CDP; the highway leads north  to Crescent and south  to the Northwest Expressway in Oklahoma City.

Lake Lattawanna is a reservoir in the eastern part of Crescent Springs; its outlet leads south through Cimarron City to the Cimarron River.

Demographics

References 

Census-designated places in Logan County, Oklahoma
Census-designated places in Oklahoma